Paragraph 182 (German:§ 182 minderjährig) is a 1927 German silent drama film directed by Ernst Winar and starring Colette Brettel, Gerhard Ritterband and Eva Speyer.

The film's sets were designed by the art director Mathieu Oostermann.

Cast
 Colette Brettel 
 Gerhard Ritterband 
 Eva Speyer
 Albert Steinrück

References

Bibliography
 Grange, William. Cultural Chronicle of the Weimar Republic. Scarecrow Press, 2008.

External links

1927 films
Films of the Weimar Republic
Films directed by Ernst Winar
German silent feature films
German black-and-white films
German drama films
1927 drama films
Silent drama films
1920s German films